Pennsylvania, the fifth most populous state in the United States, is the birthplace or childhood home of many famous Americans. People from Pennsylvania are called "Pennsylvanians".

The following is a list of notable Americans who were born and/or lived a significant portion of their lives in Pennsylvania along with their primary Pennsylvania city or town of residence:

Actors
 A–B

 Erika Alexander—Philadelphia
 Keith Andes—Philadelphia
 Gerald Anthony—Pittsburgh
 Aquaria—West Chester
 Carmen Argenziano—Sharon
 Malcolm Atterbury—Philadelphia
 Frankie Avalon—Philadelphia
 Val Avery—Philadelphia
 Jack Avery (singer)—Susquehanna 
 Kevin Bacon —Philadelphia
 Brian Baker—Philadelphia
 Carroll Baker—Johnstown
 Sue Ball—Philadelphia
 Mabel Ballin—Philadelphia
 George Bancroft—Philadelphia
 George Barbier—Philadelphia
 Vince Barnett—Pittsburgh
 Eddie Barry—Philadelphia
 Ethel Barrymore—Philadelphia
 John Barrymore—Philadelphia
 Lionel Barrymore—Philadelphia
 Eddie Barth—Philadelphia
 Jessica Barth—Philadelphia
 Billy Barty—Millsboro
 Blake Bashoff—Philadelphia
 Toni Basil—Philadelphia
 Victory Bateman—Philadelphia
 Henry Bean—Philadelphia
 Billy Beck—Philadelphia
 Laurie Beechman—Philadelphia
 Chris Beetem—Philadelphia
 Beth Behrs—Lancaster
 Willam Belli—Philadelphia
 Maria Bello—Norristown
 Julie Benz—Murrysville
 Jeff Bergman—Philadelphia
 Ed Bernard—Philadelphia
 Lyle Bettger—Philadelphia
 Marki Bey—Philadelphia
 Edward Binns—Philadelphia
 Joey Bishop—Philadelphia
 Larry Bishop—Philadelphia
 Janet Blair—Altoona
 Billy Blanks—Erie
 Marc Blucas—Butler 
 Eleanor Boardman—Philadelphia
 Walter Bobbie—Scranton
 Rudy Bond—Philadelphia
 David Boreanaz—Philadelphia
 Elizabeth Crocker Bowers—Philadelphia
 Christian Bowman—Harrisburg
 Jim Boyd—Philadelphia
 Peter Boyle—Philadelphia
 Glenn Branca—Harrisburg
 Laura Breckenridge—Flourtown
 El Brendel—Philadelphia
 David Brenner—Philadelphia
 Al Bridge—Philadelphia
 Fran Brill—Chester
 Charles Bronson—Ehrenfeld
 Scott Martin Brooks—Philadelphia
 Robert Curtis Brown—Bucks County
 Andrew Bryniarski—Philadelphia
 Bobby Burns—Philadelphia
 Edmund Burns—Philadelphia
 Steve Burns—Boyertown/Gilbertsville
 Fritzi Burr—Philadelphia
 Clarissa Burt—Philadelphia
 Eugene Byrd—Philadelphia

 C–D

 Rachel Carson—Springdale
 Sabrina Carpenter—East Greenville
 Alexandra Chando—Bethlehem
 Kitty Chen—Philadelphia
 Dennis Christopher—Philadelphia
 Brian Patrick Clarke—Gettysburg
 Caitlin Clarke—Pittsburgh
 Lauren Cohan—Philadelphia
 Julia Cohen (born 1989)—Philadelphia
 Jack Coleman—Easton
 Marc Connelly—McKeesport
 Michael Constantine—Reading
 Josh Cooke—Philadelphia
 Bradley Cooper—Jenkintown
 Ellen Corby—Philadelphia
 Bill Cosby—Philadelphia
 Michael Cornacchia—Philadelphia
 Dolores Costello—Pittsburgh
 Maurice Costello—Pittsburgh
 Erin Cottrell—Yardley
 Broderick Crawford—Philadelphia
 Rebecca Creskoff—Philadelphia
 Pat Crowley—Olyphant
 Jon Daly—Pittsburgh
 James Darren—Philadelphia
 John Davidson—Pittsburgh
 Ann B. Davis—Erie
 Bruce Davison—Philadelphia
 John de Lancie—Philadelphia
 Kim Delaney—Roxborough
 Kat Dennings—Bryn Mawr
 Joe DeRosa—Collegeville
 Patti Deutsch—Pittsburgh
 Devon—Hellertown
 Mia Dillon—Newtown Township
 Joanie Dodds—Beaver Falls
 Jack Dodson—Pittsburgh
 John Doman—Philadelphia
 Heather Donahue—Upper Darby
 Omar Doom—Easton
 Ellen Albertini Dow—Mount Carmel
 Ralph Dunn—Titusville

 E–G

 Lisa Eichhorn—Reading
 Lisa Emery—Pittsburgh
 Chip Esten—Pittsburgh
 Patrick Fabian—Pittsburgh / New Cumberland
 Tina Fey—Upper Darby
 W.C. Fields—Philadelphia
 Larry Fine—Philadelphia
 Bette Ford—McKeesport
 Meg Foster—Reading
 Matthew Fox—Abington
 Jonathan Frakes—Bellefonte
 Martin Gabel—Philadelphia
 Megan Gallagher—Reading 
 Kyle Gallner—West Chester
 Rita Gam—Pittsburgh
 Billy Gardell—Pittsburgh
 Janet Gaynor—Philadelphia
 Deborah Geffner—Pittsburgh
 Richard Gere—Philadelphia
 Ileen Getz—Bristol
 Todd Glass—Philadelphia
 Scott Glenn—Pittsburgh
 Jeff Goldblum—Pittsburgh
 Eve Gordon—Pittsburgh
 Frank Gorshin—Pittsburgh
 Seth Green—Philadelphia
 Charles Grodin—Pittsburgh
 Jonathan Groff—Lancaster

 H–K

 Kevin Peter Hall—Pittsburgh
 Charles Hallahan—Philadelphia
 Veronica Hamel—Philadelphia
 Kevin Hart—Philadelphia
 Tim Heidecker—Allentown
 Sherman Hemsley—Philadelphia
 Lauren Holly—Bristol
 Gillian Jacobs—Mt. Lebanon
 Anthony Jeselnik—Pittsburgh / Upper St. Clair
 Cherie Johnson—Pittsburgh
 Clark Johnson—Philadelphia
 Russell Johnson—Ashley
 Kendall Johnson—Lower Merion
 Johnny Jolin—Montoursville
 Angela Jones—Greensburg
 Shirley Jones—Charleroi
 Mario Joyner—Pittsburgh
 James Karen—Wilkes-Barre
 JP Karliak–Scranton
 Tim Kazurinsky—Johnstown
 Staci Keanan–Devon
 Michael Keaton—Pittsburgh
 Sheila Kelley—Greensburg
 Gene Kelly—Pittsburgh
 Grace Kelly (Princess of Monaco)—Philadelphia
 Michael Kelly—Philadelphia
 Jamie Kennedy—Upper Darby
 Rya Kihlstedt—Lancaster
 Daniel Dae Kim—Bethlehem
 Taylor Kinney—Lancaster
 Jack Klugman—Philadelphia
 Eddie Korbich—Shamokin
 Harley Jane Kozak—Wilkes-Barre
 Nancy Kulp—Miffilintown
 Jack Krizmanich—Phoenixville

 L–M

 Liz Larsen—Philadelphia
 Andrew Lawrence—Philadelphia
 Joey Lawrence—Philadelphia
 Matthew Lawrence—Abington Township
 Joshua Leonard—State College
 Richard LeParmentier—Pittsburgh
 David Lewis—Philadelphia
 Gilbert Lewis—Philadelphia
 Heather Lind—Upland
 Jonathan Loughran—Philadelphia
 Beverly Lynne—Sellersville
 Jeanette MacDonald—Philadelphia
 Aline MacMahon—Pittsburgh
 Connor Maloney—Harrisburg
 Joe Manganiello—Pittsburgh / Mt. Lebanon
 Jayne Mansfield—Bryn Mawr
 Bam Margera—West Chester
 Mark Margolis—Philadelphia
 Hugh Marlowe—Philadelphia
 Adoni Maropis—Pittsburgh
 Joe Maross—Barnesboro
 Lynne Marta—Philadelphia
 Al Martino—Philadelphia
 Eric Martsolf—Harrisburg
 Jackie Mason—Latrobe
 Mark Matkevich—Philadelphia
 Elaine May—Philadelphia
 Melanie Mayron—Philadelphia
 Mitzi McCall—Pittsburgh
 Brooke McCarter—Philadelphia
 Paul McCrane—Philadelphia / Richboro
 Mary McDonnell—Wilkes-Barre
 Rob McElhenney—Philadelphia
 Matthew McGrory—West Chester
 Joel McHale—Philadelphia
 Frank McHugh—Allegheny County
 Kate McNeil—Philadelphia
 Larry Mendte—Lansdowne
 Adolphe Menjou—Pittsburgh
 Charles Meredith—Knoxville
 Mary Lou Metzger—Philadelphia
 James A Michener—Doylestown
 Kate Micucci—Nazareth
 Vic Mignogna—Pittsburgh
 R. A. Mihailoff—Titusville
 Dennis Miller—Pittsburgh
 Jason Miller—Scranton
 Lara Jill Miller—Allentown
 Kristin Minter—Yardley
 Cameron Mitchell—Dallastown
 Tom Mix—Mix Run
 Katherine Moennig—Philadelphia
 Kelly Monaco—Philadelphia
 Pauline Moore—Harrisburg
 Jillian Murray—Reading

 N–R

 Kelly Neal—Philadelphia
 Irene Ng—Allentown
 Greg Nicotero—Pittsburgh
 J. J. North—Philadelphia
 Jay Oakerson—Philadelphia
 Cheri Oteri—Upper Darby
 Jerry Orbach—Wilkes-Barre
 Beth Ostrosky—Pittsburgh
 Jack Palance—Hazle Township
 Stuart Pankin—Philadelphia
 Sydney Park—Philadelphia
 Adrian Pasdar—Powelton Village
 Steven Pasquale—Hershey
 Michele Pawk—Butler
 Pamela Payton-Wright—Pittsburgh
 Kelly Perine—State College
 Robert Picardo—Philadelphia
 Pink (Alecia Moore)—Doylestown
 Joel Polis—Philadelphia
 Jon Polito—Philadelphia
 Billy Porter—Pittsburgh
 William Powell—Pittsburgh
 Robert Prosky—Philadelphia
 Zachary Quinto—Pittsburgh
 James Rebhorn—Philadelphia
 Krysten Ritter—Bloomsburg/Shickshinny
 Erica Rivera—Philadelphia
 Keith Robinson—Philadelphia
 Holly Robinson-Peete—Philadelphia
 Daniel Roebuck—Bethlehem
 Fred Rogers—Latrobe
 George A. Romero—Pittsburgh
 Norman Rose—Philadelphia
 Zelda Rubinstein—Pittsburgh
 Herbert Rudley—Philadelphia

 S–Z

 Bob Saget—Philadelphia
 Diane Salinger—Philadelphia
 Richard Sanders—Harrisburg
 Tom Savini—Pittsburgh
 Jennifer Sciole—Philadelphia
 Lizabeth Scott—Scranton
 David O. Selznick—Pittsburgh
 Amanda Seyfried—Allentown
 Craig Sheffer—York
 M. Night Shyamalan—Philadelphia
 Penny Singleton—Philadelphia
 Emil Sitka—Johnstown
 Jonathan Slavin—Wilkes-Barre
 Kerr Smith—Exton
 Will Smith—Philadelphia
 Dana Snyder—Allentown
 Timothy Stack—Doylestown
 Robert Sterling—New Castle
 James Stewart—Indiana
 Sharon Stone—Meadville area
 Joseph Sweeney—Philadelphia
 Taylor Swift—West Reading
 Christine Taylor—Allentown
 Holland Taylor—Philadelphia
 Teller—Philadelphia
 Miles Teller—Downingtown
 Mary Testa—Philadelphia
 Jonathan Taylor Thomas—Bethlehem
 Paul F. Tompkins—Philadelphia
 William Tracy—Pittsburgh
 Tom Verica—Philadelphia
 Mike Vogel—Abington/Warminster
 Brendon Walsh—Philadelphia
 Lisa Waltz—Limerick
 Eric Wareheim—Audubon
 Fritz Weaver—Pittsburgh
 Michael Willis—Lancaster
 Thomas F. Wilson—Philadelphia/Wayne
 Danny Woodburn—Philadelphia
 Chris Young—Chambersburg
 Winter Ave Zoli—New Hope

Artists

 Julian Abele, architect—Philadelphia
 Alice Aycock, sculptor—Harrisburg
 Edmund Bacon, architect—Philadelphia
 Paul Bartholomew, architect—Ligonier
 Karen Bausman, architect—Allentown
 Alison Bechdel, graphic novelist—Beech Creek
 Cecilia Beaux, painter—Philadelphia
 Alexander Calder, sculptor—Lawnton
 Mary Cassatt, painter—Allegheny City
 George Catlin, painter—Wilkes-Barre
 Stuart Davis, painter—Philadelphia
 Charles Demuth, painter—Lancaster
 Steve Ditko, comic book artist—Johnstown
 Thomas Eakins, painter—Philadelphia
 William Glackens, painter—Philadelphia
 Martha Graham, modern dancer and choreographer—Allegheny City
 Keith Haring, painter—Kutztown
 Jerry Harris, sculptor—Pittsburgh
 William Stanley Haseltine, painter—Philadelphia
 Mike Hawthorne, comic book artist, illustrator—York
 Martin Johnson Heade, painter—Lumberville
 Gelsey Kirkland, ballerina—Bethlehem
 Franz Kline, painter—Wilkes-Barre
 Jeff Koons, sculptor—York
 Nate Lewis, visual artist—Beaver Falls
 Thaddeus Mosley, sculptor—Pittsburgh
 Alice Neel, painter—Colwyn
 Violet Oakley, painter—Philadelphia
 Maxfield Parrish, illustrator—Philadelphia
 Philip Pearlstein, painter—Pittsburgh
 Joseph Pennell, illustrator—Philadelphia
 Man Ray, artist and photographer—Philadelphia
 Charles Sheeler, painter, photographer—Philadelphia
 Grover Simcox, illustrator—Philadelphia
 John Sloan, painter—Lock Haven
 Gary Mark Smith, global street photographer—Kutztown
 Jeff Smith, cartoonist—McKees Rocks
 Thomas Ustick Walter, architect—Philadelphia
 Andy Warhol, pop culture artist—Pittsburgh
 Neil Welliver, landscape artist—Millville
 Andrew Wyeth, painter—Chadds Ford Township
 Jamie Wyeth, painter (son of Andrew)—Chadds Ford Township
 N.C. Wyeth, illustrator (father of Andrew)—Chadds Ford Township
 Bunny Yeager, photographer—Wilkinsburg

Astronauts

 Jerome Apt, NASA astronaut—Pittsburgh
 Guion S. Bluford, astronaut, first African-American man in space—Philadelphia
 Pete Conrad, Gemini, Apollo, and Skylab astronaut, third man to walk on the Moon—Philadelphia
 Michael Fincke—Pittsburgh
 Theodore Freeman, Group 3 astronaut; killed in training jet accident—Haverford
 Terry Hart, NASA astronaut—Pittsburgh
 James Irwin, Apollo 15—Pittsburgh
 Glynn Lunney, NASA engineer—Old Forge
 David Medved, trained astronaut and physicist—Philadelphia
 Paul W. Richards, Shuttle and ISS astronaut—Dunmore
 Patricia Hilliard Robertson, 1998 Astronaut Group—killed in private airplane accident—Indiana
 Daniel M. Tani, engineer, NASA astronaut—Ridley Park
 Joseph A. Walker, USAF/NASA astronaut, United States' seventh man in space—Washington, Pennsylvania
 Paul J. Weitz, Skylab and Shuttle astronaut—Erie

Athletes

"HOF" = Hall of Fame
 A–B

 John Abramovic, professional basketball player—Pittsburgh
 Cal Abrams (1924–1997), Major League Baseball player—Philadelphia
 Matt Adams, professional baseball player—Philipsburg
 Herb Adderley, HOF professional football player—Philadelphia
 Eddie Alvarez, professional mixed martial artist—Philadelphia
 Rubén Amaro Jr. (born 1965), Major League Baseball player, general manager, and coach—Philadelphia
 Joe Amato, professional drag racer—Old Forge
 John Andretti, NASCAR driver—Bethlehem
 Marco Andretti, auto racing driver—Nazareth
 Michael Andretti, auto racing driver—Bethlehem
 Kurt Angle, professional wrestler, Olympic gold medalist in freestyle wrestling—Pittsburgh
 Paul Arizin, HOF professional basketball player—Philadelphia
 LaVar Arrington, professional football player—Pittsburgh
 Cameron Artis-Payne, professional football player—Harrisburg
 Al Babartsky, professional football player—Shenandoah
 Bob Babich, professional football coach—Aliquippa
 Kayla Bashore, Olympic field hockey player—Hamburg
 Ralph Baker, professional football player—Lewistown
Saquon Barkley, professional football player—Coplay
 Charlie Batch, professional football player—Homestead
 William Beatty, professional football player—York
 Aaron Beasley, professional football player—Pottstown
 Joe Beimel, professional baseball player—Kersey
 Stan Belinda, professional baseball player—Huntingdon
 Bert Bell, professional football commissioner—Philadelphia
 Brad Benson, professional football player—Altoona
 Norm Benning, NASCAR driver—Level Green
 Jesse Biddle, professional baseball player—Philadelphia
 Fred Biletnikoff, HOF professional football player—Erie
 Steve Bilko, professional baseball player—Nanticoke
 Adam Bisnowaty (born 1993), professional football player—Pittsburgh
 Steve Blackman, professional wrestler—Annville
 DeJuan Blair, professional basketball player—Pittsburgh
 George Blanda, HOF professional football player—Youngwood
 Chaim Bloom (born 1983), Chief Baseball Officer for the Boston Red Sox
 Charlie Bolling, professional golfer—Rosemont
 Sam Bowie, professional basketball player—Lebanon
 Jerry Boyarsky, professional football player—Scott Township
 Tyler Boyd, professional football player–Clairton
 Kyle Brady, professional football player—Camp Hill
 Sid Bream, professional baseball player—Mount Holly Springs
 Steve Breaston, professional football player—North Braddock
 Gustave Brickner, extreme swimmer—Charleroi
 Tom Brookens, professional baseball player—Chambersburg
 Corey Brown, professional football player—Philadelphia
 Gary Brown, professional football player—Williamsport
 John Brown, HOF college football player—Canton
 Philly Brown, professional football player—Upper Darby
 Scott Brunner, professional football player—Sellersville
 Kobe Bryant, professional basketball player—Lower Merion Township
 Taylor Buchholz, professional baseball player—Lower Merion Township
 Ryan Buchter, professional baseball player—Reading
 Marc Bulger, professional football player—Pittsburgh
 Leroy Burrell, track and field—Lansdowne
 Rasual Butler, professional basketball player—Philadelphia
 Nate Byham, NFL tight end—Franklin
 Axtell J. Byles, NFL Player—Titusville

 C–D

 Alex Cabrera, professional baseball player—Lebanon
 Ray Caldwell, professional baseball player—McKean County
 John Calipari, college basketball coach—Moon Township
 Roy Campanella, HOF professional baseball player—Philadelphia
 Russ Canzler, professional baseball player—Berwick
 John Cappelletti, professional football player—Upper Darby
 P. J. Carlesimo, professional basketball coach—Scranton
 Nate Carr, Olympic bronze medalist in freestyle wrestling—Erie
Tony Carr (born 1997), basketball player in the Israeli Premier Basketball League-Philadelphia
 Pete Carril, HOF college basketball coach—Bethlehem
 Matt Carroll, professional basketball player—Pittsburgh
 Len Chappell, professional basketball player—Portage
 Wilt Chamberlain, HOF professional basketball player—Philadelphia
 Barry Church, professional football player—Pittsburgh
 Nestor Chylak, professional baseball umpire—Olyphant
 Bruce Clark, professional football player—New Castle
 Bryan Cohen (born 1989), American-Israeli professional basketball player—Philadelphia
 Colby Cohen (born 1989), professional ice hockey player—Villanova
 Jake Cohen (born 1990), American-Israeli professional basketball player—Bryn Mawr
 Julia Cohen (born 1989), tennis player—Philadelphia
 Billy Conn, professional boxer—Pittsburgh
 James Conner, professional football player—Erie, Pennsylvania
 Harry Coveleski, professional baseball player—Shamokin
 Stan Coveleski, HOF baseball player—Shamokin
 Fran Crippen, swimmer—Conshohocken
 Maddy Crippen, Olympic swimmer—Conshohocken
 Tom Clements, professional football coach—McKees Rocks
 Gary Collins, professional football player—Williamstown
 Joe Collins, professional baseball player—Scranton
 Kerry Collins, professional football player—Lebanon
 Marques Colston, professional football player—Susquehanna Township
 Dan Conners, professional football player—St. Mary's
 Dan Connor, professional football player—Wallingford
 Mark Corey, professional baseball player—Austin
 Mike Costanzo, professional baseball player—Philadelphia
 Jim Covert, professional football player—Conway
 Bill Cowher, professional football coach—Crafton
 Billy Cox, professional baseball player—Newport
 Mike Cox, professional football player—Lewisberry
 Channing Crowder, professional football player—State College
 Chris Culliver, professional football player—Philadelphia
 David Curtiss, competitive swimmer—Yardley
 Chuck Daly, HOF professional basketball coach—Kane
 Bob Davie, college football coach—Moon Township
 Ernie Davis, HOF college football player—New Salem-Buffington
 Phil Davis, UFC fighter—Harrisburg
 Darrell Dess, professional football player—New Castle
 James Develin, professional football player—Boyertown
 Dorin Dickerson, professional football player—Imperial
 Keir Dillon, professional snowboarder—East Stroudsburg
 Mike Ditka, HOF professional football player and coach—Aliquippa
 Randy Dobnak, professional baseball player—South Park
 Tim Donaghy, professional basketball referee—Havertown
 Aaron Donald, professional football player—Pittsburgh
 Jakim Donaldson (born 1983), basketball player in the Israeli Basketball Premier League–Pittsburgh
 Keith Dorney, professional football player—Emmaus
 Tony Dorsett, HOF professional football player—Hopewell Township
 Forrest "Jap" Douds, professional football player and coach—Rochester
 Shane Douglas, professional wrestler—Pittsburgh
 Jim Drucker (born 1952/1953), former Commissioner of the Continental Basketball Association, former Commissioner of the Arena Football League, and founder of NewKadia Comics—Plymouth Meeting
 Jeff Dugan, professional football player—Pittsburgh
 Pete Duranko, professional football player—Johnstown
 Jimmy Dykes, professional baseball player—Philadelphia
 Stanley Dziedzic, Olympic bronze medalist in freestyle wrestling—Allentown

 E–G

 Bill Eadie, professional wrestler—Brownsville
 Kyle Eckel, professional football player—Philadelphia
 Josh Edgin, professional baseball player—Three Springs
 Wayne Ellington, professional basketball player—Wynnewood
 Cody Eppley, professional baseball player—Dillsburg
 Jahri Evans, professional football player—Philadelphia
 Tyreke Evans, professional basketball player—Chester
 Tim Federowicz, professional baseball player—Erie
 Bill Ferrario, professional football player—Scranton
 Randy Fichtner, professional football coach—Meadville
 Frank Filchock, professional football player and coach—Greene County
 D'or Fischer (born 1981), Israeli-American basketball player in the Israeli National League—Philadelphia
 Joe Flacco, professional football player—Philadelphia
 Pat Flaherty, professional football coach—McSherrystown
 Hali Flickinger, Olympic swimmer—York County
 Andre Fluellen, professional football player—Philadelphia
 Tom Flynn, professional football player—Verona
 Nellie Fox, HOF professional baseball player—St. Thomas Township
 Terry Francona, professional baseball manager—New Brighton
 Tito Francona, professional baseball player—New Brighton
 John Frank (born 1962), professional football player—Pittsburgh
 Buck Freeman, professional baseball player—Catasauqua
 Gus Frerotte, professional football player—Kittanning
 Carl Furillo, professional baseball player–Stony Creek Mills
 Jim Furyk, professional golfer—Lancaster
 Rich Gannon, professional football player—Philadelphia
 Ryan Garko, professional baseball player—Pittsburgh
 Jason Garrett, professional football coach—Abington
 John Garrett, professional football coach—Danville
 Eddie George, professional football player—Abington Township
 Sam Gerson, Olympic silver medalist in freestyle wrestling—Philadelphia
 Sean Gilbert, professional football player—Aliquippa
 Armen Gilliam, professional basketball player—Bethel Park
 Garry Gilliam, professional football player—Harrisburg
 Kimberly Glass, professional volleyball player—Lancaster
 Tom Gola, HOF basketball player—Philadelphia
 Robbie Gould, professional football player—Jersey Shore
 Bruce Gradkowski, professional football player—Pittsburgh
 Gino Gradkowski, professional football player—Pittsburgh
 Aaron Gray, professional basketball player—Emmaus
 Dick Gray, professional baseball player—Jefferson
 Al Gionfriddo, professional baseball player—Dysart
 Ken Griffey Jr., professional baseball player—Donora
 Ken Griffey Sr., professional baseball player—Donora
 Russ Grimm, professional football player—Scottdale
 Dick Groat, professional baseball player—Wilkinsburg
 Randy Grossman (born 1952), professional football player—Haverford Township
 Peter Gruner, professional wrestler, ring name Billy Kidman—Allentown
 Brandon Guyer, professional baseball player—West Chester

 H–K

 Jack Ham, professional football player—Johnstown
 Richard Hamilton, professional basketball player
 Brendan Hansen, Olympic gold medal swimmer—Haverford Township
 Marvin Harrison, professional football player—Philadelphia
 Ray Harroun, winner of the first Indianapolis 500—Titusville
 Leon Hart, professional football player—Pittsburgh
 Jim Haslett, professional football player and coach—Pittsburgh
 Andrew Hawkins, professional football player—Johnstown
 Artrell Hawkins, professional football player—Johnstown
 Don Heffner, professional baseball player and manager—Rouzerville
 Chris Heisey, professional baseball player—Mount Joy
 John Heisman, football player, namesake of trophy—Titusville
 Gerald Henderson Jr., professional basketball player—Merion
 Chad Henne, professional football player—Wyomissing
 Jake Herbert, Olympic freestyle wrestler—Pittsburgh
 Tom Herr, professional baseball player and manager—Lancaster
 Mark Herzlich, professional football player—Wayne
 Cameron Heyward, professional football player—Pittsburgh
 Eric Hicks, professional football player—Erie
 Jordan Hill, professional football player—Harrisburg
 Shawn Hillegas, professional baseball player—South Fork
 Darrun Hilliard, professional basketball player
 Al Holbert, professional auto racer—Warrington
 Larry Holmes, HOF professional boxer—Easton
 J. J. Hoover, professional baseball player—Elizabeth
 Bernard Hopkins, professional boxer—Philadelphia
 Jeff Hostetler, professional football player—Hollsopple
 Art Howe, professional baseball player and manager—Pittsburgh
 Gene Huey, professional football player—Uniontown
 Henry Hynoski, professional football player—Elysburg
 Jerald Ingram, professional football coach—Beaver
 Qadry Ismail, professional football player—Wilkes-Barre
 Raghib Ismail, professional football player—Wilkes-Barre
 Marc Jackson, professional basketball player—Philadelphia
 Marlin Jackson, professional football player—Sharon
 Reggie Jackson, HOF professional baseball player—Wyncote
 Brook Jacoby, professional baseball player—Philadelphia
 Hughie Jennings, professional baseball player—Pittston
 Larry Johnson, professional football player—State College
 Derrick Jones Jr., professional basketball player—Chester
 Eddie Jones, professional basketball player—Philadelphia
 Kevin Jones, professional BMX rider—York
 Sage Karam, professional racing driver—Nazareth
 George Karl, professional basketball coach—Penn Hills
 Nate Karns, professional baseball player—Franklin
 Don Kelly, professional baseball player—Butler
 Jim Kelly, HOF professional football player—Bradys Bend Township
 Pat Kelly, professional baseball player—Philadelphia
 Ray Kemp, professional football player—Cecil Township
 Billy Kidman (ring name), professional wrestler—Allentown
 Ethan Kilmer, professional football player—Wyalusing
 Bucko Kilroy, professional football player and coach—Philadelphia
 Betsy King, HOF professional golfer—Reading
 Steve Kline, professional baseball player—Winfield
 Cary Kolat, freestyle wrestler, two-time world medalist—Rices Landing
 Dan Koppen, professional football player—Whitehall Township
 Josh Koscheck, professional mixed martial artist—Waynesburg
 Kristy Kowal, Olympic swimmer—Reading
 Bruce Kozerski, professional football player—Plains Township
 Erik Kratz, professional baseball player—Telford
Julian Krinsky, tennis player-Philadelphia
 John Kuhn, professional football player—Dover

 L–M

 Floyd Landis, professional cyclist—Lancaster
 Tom Lasorda, HOF professional baseball manager—Norristown
 Howard Lassoff (1955–2013), American-Israeli basketball player
 Ty Law, professional football player—Aliquippa
 Sean Lee, professional football player—Pittsburgh
 Don LeJohn, professional baseball manager—Daisytown
 Matt Lengel, professional football player—Mechanicsburg
 Chad Levitt, professional football player—Cheltenham
 Dion Lewis, professional football player—Penn Hills
 Grant Lewis, professional ice hockey player—Upper St. Clair
 Ralph Lewis, professional basketball player and coach—Philadelphia
 Ryan Lexer (born 1976), American-Israeli basketball player—Philadelphia
 Tara Lipinski, Olympic gold medalist in figure skating—Philadelphia
 Kyle Lowry, professional basketball player—Philadelphia
 Maurice Lucas, professional basketball player—Pittsburgh
 Johnny Lujack, HOF professional football player—Connellsville
 Chloe Lukasiak, actor, featured dancer on Dance Moms—Churchill (Pittsburgh/Mars)
 Sparky Lyle professional baseball player—Reynoldsville
 Joe Maddon, professional baseball manager—Hazleton
 Brooke Makler (1951–2010), Olympic fencer
 Paul Makler Jr. (born 1946), Olympic fencer
 Paul Makler Sr. (born 1920), Olympic fencer
 Ryan Malone, professional hockey player—Upper St. Clair
 Greg Manusky, professional football player—Dallas
 Bam Margera, professional skateboarder—West Chester
 Pete Maravich, HOF professional basketball player—Aliquippa
 Dan Marino, HOF professional football player—Pittsburgh
 Brandon Marshall, professional football player—Pittsburgh
 Donyell Marshall, professional basketball player—Reading
 Tim Masthay, professional football player—Pittsburgh
 Christy Mathewson, HOF professional baseball player—Factoryville
 Michael R. Matz, Olympic equestrian and thoroughbred trainer—Collegeville
 Pat McAfee, professional football player—Plum
 Matt McBride, professional baseball player—Bethlehem
 Ed McCaffrey, professional football player—Waynesboro
 Joe McCarthy, HOF baseball manager—Philadelphia
 Mike McCarthy, American football coach—Pittsburgh
 John J. McDermott, professional golfer—Philadelphia
 Jameel McClain, professional football player—Philadelphia
 Robert McClain, professional football player—Philadelphia
 LeSean McCoy, professional football player—Harrisburg
 Mike McCoy, professional football player—Erie
 Muffet McGraw, college basketball coach—Pottstown
 Aaron Mckie, professional basketball player—Philadelphia
 Josephine McKim, Olympic swimming gold medalist—Oil City
 Brandon McManus, professional football player—Philadelphia
 Rocco Mediate, professional golfer—Greensburg
 Mike Mentzer, bodybuilder, 1979 Mr. Olympia—Ephrata
 Devin Mesoraco, professional baseball player—Punxsutawney
 Lou Michaels, professional football player—Swoyersville
 Walt Michaels, pro football player and coach—Swoyersville
 Matt Millen, professional football player—Whitehall Township
 Abby Lee Miller, star of Pittsburgh-based Dance Moms and owner of Abby Lee Dance Company—Penn Hills
 Eric Milton, professional baseball pitcher—Bellefonte
 Cuttino Mobley, professional basketball player—Philadelphia
 Earl Monroe, HOF professional basketball player—Philadelphia
 Joe Montana, HOF professional football player—New Eagle
 Nick Moody, professional football player—Wyncote
 Charles Morgan, professional football player—Allentown
 Lenny Moore, HOF professional football player—Reading
 Michael Moorer, professional boxer—Monessen
 Marcus Morris, professional basketball player—Philadelphia
 Markieff Morris, professional basketball player—Philadelphia
 Mercury Morris, professional football player—Pittsburgh
 Jamie Moyer, professional baseball player—Sellersville
 Terry Mulholland, professional baseball player—Uniontown
 Mike Munchak, professional football player—Scranton
 Ryan Mundy, professional football player—Pittsburgh
 James Mungro, professional football player—East Stroudsburg
 Flip Murray, professional basketball player—Philadelphia
 Stan Musial, HOF professional baseball player—Donora
 Mike Mussina, professional baseball player—Montoursville

 N–R

 Joe Namath, HOF professional football player—Beaver Falls
 Bridget Namiotka (born 1990), pair skater
 Ryan Nassib, professional football player—West Chester
 Jameer Nelson, professional basketball player—Chester
 Lucas Nix, professional football player—Clairton
 Jordan Norwood, professional football player—State College
 Marty Nothstein, professional cyclist, 2000 Olympics gold medalist—Emmaus
 Jared Odrick, professional football player—Lebanon
 Bo Orlando, professional football player—Berwick
 Ben Olsen, professional soccer player and coach—Middletown
 Joe Ostrowski, professional baseball player—West Wyoming
 Ed Ott, professional baseball player—Muncy
 Doug Overton, professional basketball coach—Philadelphia, Pennsylvania
 Billy Owens, professional basketball player—Carlisle
 Arnold Palmer, HOF professional golfer—Latrobe
 George Parros, professional hockey player—Washington
 Sean Payton, professional football head coach for the New Orleans Saints—Philadelphia
 Todd Peck, professional racing driver—Glenville
 Corey Peters, professional football player—Pittsburgh
 Zach Pfeffer (born 1995), soccer player—Dresher
 Mike Piazza, HOF professional baseball player—Norristown
 Bernard Pierce, professional football player—Ardmore
 Jason Pinkston, professional football player—Pittsburgh
 Lousaka Polite, professional football player—North Braddock
 Paul Posluszny, professional football player—Hopewell Township
 Abner Charles Powell, professional baseball player, owner, innovator—Shenandoah
 Terrelle Pryor, professional football player—Jeannette
 Justin Pugh, professional football player—Holland
 Christian Pulisic, professional soccer player—Hershey
 Andre Reed, HOF professional football player—Allentown
 Dylan Reese (born 1984), NHL ice hockey player—Pittsburgh
 Frank Reich, professional football player—Lebanon
 Nolan Reimold, professional baseball player—Greenville
 Nicole Reinhart, professional cyclist—Macungie
 Rocky Reynolds, professional wrestler—Titusville
 Darrelle Revis, professional football player—Aliquippa
 Mike Richter, professional hockey player—Abington
 Garth Rickards, professional racing driver—Mechanicsburg
 Adam Rippon, Olympic bronze medalist in figure skating—Clarks Summit
 Jon Ritchie, professional football player—Mechanicsburg 
 Bill Robinson, professional baseball player, coach—McKeesport
 Ed Roebuck, professional baseball player—East Millsboro
 Malik Rose, professional basketball player—Philadelphia
 Mike Rosenthal (born 1977), NFL football player—Pittsburgh
 Tim Ruddy, professional football player—Dunmore
 Bobby Ryan, professional ice hockey player—Philadelphia
 Matt Ryan, professional football player—Exton

 S–Z

 Brandon Saad, professional hockey player—Pittsburgh
 Jack Sack (1902–1980), football player and coach
 John Salmons, professional basketball player—Philadelphia
 Bruno Sammartino, professional wrestler—Pittsburgh
 Bob Sanders, professional football player—Erie
 Jerry Sandusky, college football coach—Washington
 Carl Sawatski, professional baseball player—Shickshinny
 Matt Schaub, professional football player—Pittsburgh
 Steve Schlachter (born 1954), American-Israeli basketball player—Plymouth Meeting
 Allison Schmitt, Olympic swimmer–Pittsburgh
 Brian Schneider, professional baseball player—Northampton
 Marty Schottenheimer, professional football coach
 Mike Scioscia, professional baseball player and manager—Morton
 Coleman Scott, Olympic bronze medalist in freestyle wrestling—Waynesburg
 Da'Rel Scott, professional football player—Conshohocken
 Vic Seixas (born 1923), professional Hall of Fame tennis player
Nate Sestina (born 1997), basketball player in the Israeli Basketball Premier League
 Mustafa Shakur, professional basketball player—Philadelphia
 Bobby Shantz, professional baseball player—Pottstown
 Kirk Shelmerdine, NASCAR crew chief and driver—Philadelphia
 Jean Shiley, Olympic track and field gold medalist—Harrisburg
 Dick Shiner, professional football player—Lebanon
 A. Q. Shipley, professional football player—Coraopolis
 Tom Skladany, professional football player—Bethel Park
 Greg Skrepenak, professional football player—Wilkes Barre
 Steve Slaton, professional football player—Levittown
 Kevin Slowey, professional baseball player—Upper St. Clair
 Musa Smith, professional football player—New Bloomfield
 Garrett Smithley, professional racing driver—Ligionier
 Gene Snitsky, professional wrestler—Nesquehoning
 Frank Spellman (1922–2017), Olympic champion weightlifter—Malvern, Philadelphia, York
 Jimmy Spencer, professional racecar driver—Berwick
 Shawntae Spencer, professional football player—Rankin
 Eddie Stanky, professional baseball player and manager—Philadelphia
 Larod Stephens-Howling, professional football player—Johnstown
 Mark Stepnoski, professional football player—Erie
 Tony Stewart, professional football player—Allentown
 Devin Street, professional football player—Bethlehem
 Ross Stripling, professional baseball player—Blue Bell
 Big John Studd, professional wrestler—Butler
 Joe Stydahar, professional football player and coach—Kaylor
 Matt Suhey, professional football player—Bellefonte
 Bob Sura, professional basketball player—Wilkes-Barre
 Bruce Sutter, HOF professional baseball player—Lancaster
 Chuck Tanner, professional baseball player and manager—New Castle
 Jason Taylor, professional football player—Pittsburgh
 Ray Tesser, professional football player—Titusville
 Walter Tewksbury, Olympian track and field athlete—Ashley
 Jaimie Thomas, professional football player—Harrisburg
 Myles Thomas, professional baseball player—State College
 Carol Semple Thompson, amateur golfer—Sewickley
 Jim Thorpe, various—Carlisle, only connected posthumously to Jim Thorpe
 Jim Tomsula, professional football coach—Homestead
 Wallace Triplett, professional football player—Cheltenham Township
 Charley Trippi, HOF professional football player—Pittston
 Bob Tucker, professional football player—Hazleton
 Emlen Tunnell, HOF professional football player—Bryn Mawr
 Dave Twardzik, professional basketball player—Middletown
 R.J. Umberger, professional hockey player—Pittsburgh
 Johnny Unitas, HOF professional football player—Pittsburgh
 Mickey Vernon, professional baseball player—Marcus Hook
 Iosif Vitebskiy (born 1938), Soviet Ukrainian Olympic medalist and world champion épée fencer and fencing coach—Philadelphia
 Honus Wagner, HOF professional baseball player—Chartiers Township
 Dion Waiters, professional basketball player—Philadelphia
 Christian Walker, professional baseball player—Norristown
 Neil Walker, professional baseball player—Pittsburgh
 Art Wall Jr., professional golfer—Honesdale
 Rasheed Wallace, professional basketball player—Philadelphia
 Ed Walsh, HOF professional baseball player—Plains Township
 Joe Walton, professional football coach—Beaver Falls
 Hakim Warrick, professional basketball player—Philadelphia
 Earl Watford, professional football player—Philadelphia
 Kenny Watson, professional football player—Harrisburg
 Ricky Watters, professional football player—Harrisburg
 Bobby Weaver, Olympic gold medal freestyle wrestler–Easton
 Reggie Wells, professional football player—South Park
 Johnny Weir, professional and Olympic figure skater—Coatesville
 Randy White, HOF professional football player—Pittsburgh
 Brian Williams, professional football player—Mt. Lebanon
Early Williams (born 1951), American-Israeli basketball player
 Lauryn Williams, Summer and Winter Olympic medalist—Rochester
 Josh Wilson, professional baseball player—Mt. Lebanon
 Kris Wilson, professional football player—Harrisburg
 Coy Wire, professional football player—Camp Hill—Cedar Cliff
 Stefen Wisniewski, professional football player—Pittsburgh
 Lee Woodall, professional football player—Carlisle
 Tom Woodeshick, professional football player—Wilkes-Barre
 John Woodruff, Olympic gold medalist in track and field—Connellsville
 Blidi Wreh-Wilson, professional football player—Edinboro
 Frank Wycheck, professional football player—Philadelphia
Michael Young (born 1994), basketball player for Ironi Nahariya of the Israeli Basketball Premier League—Pittsburgh
 Stephen Zack (born 1992), basketball player
 Maddie Ziegler, actor, featured dancer on Dance Moms—Murrysville
 Mackenzie Ziegler, actor, featured dancer on Dance Moms—Murrysville

Authors, playwrights, and writers

 Edward Abbey—Indiana
 Louisa May Alcott—Germantown
 Lloyd Alexander—Philadelphia
 George Anastasia—Philadelphia
 Maxwell Anderson-Atlantic
 Poul Anderson—Bristol
 Janet Asimov—Ashland
 Mary Canfield Ballard—Troy
 Samuel Barber—West Chester
 Donald Barthelme—Philadelphia
 Ellen Bass—Philadelphia
 John Batchelor—Bryn Mawr / Lower Merion Township
 Mary Temple Bayard—Waynesburg
 Adaline Hohf Beery–Hanover
 Stan and Jan Berenstain—Philadelphia
 Ben Bova—Philadelphia
 Mary D. R. Boyd—Philadelphia
 Anna Braden—Montgomery
 Pearl S. Buck—Perkasie
 Charles Brockden Brown—Philadelphia
 Bebe Moore Campbell—Philadelphia
 Francesca Anna Canfield–—Philadelphia
 Rachel Carson—Springdale
 Diana Cavallo—Philadelphia
 Stephen Chbosky—Pittsburgh
 Helen Taggart Clark–Northumberland
 Mary M. Cohen—Philadelphia
 Marc Connelly—McKeesport
 Michael Connelly—Philadelphia
 Margaret Deland—Allegheny
 Annie Dillard—Pittsburgh
 Ella Hamilton Durley–Harrisville
 Tristan Egolf—Lancaster
 Robert Fagles—Philadelphia
 Stephen Flaherty—Pittsburgh
 Harvey Flink—Centre Hall
 Tom Flynn—Erie
 Nancy Friday—Pittsburgh
 David Fulmer—Northumberland
 Todd Gallagher—Greensburg
 Walter B. Gibson—Philadelphia
 Carmen Gentile—New Kensington
 Jim Goad—Ridley Park
 H.D. (Hilda Doolittle)—Bethlehem
 Oscar Hammerstein II—Doylestown
 Lucy Hamilton Hooper—Philadelphia
 Emeline Harriet Howe—West Hickory
 Kristin Hunter—Philadelphia
 Woody Jackson—Oil City
 Thomas Allibone Janvier—Philadelphia
 Robert T. Jeschonek—Johnstown
 Kait Kerrigan—Kingston
 Dean Koontz—Everett
 David Leavitt—Pittsburgh
 Marguerite St. Leon Loud-Wysox
 Bree Lowdermilk—Wallingford
 John D. MacDonald—Sharon
 Edith May—Philadelphia
 David McCullough—Pittsburgh
 Henry Meyer—Centre County
 James A. Michener—Doylestown
 Jason Miller—Scranton
 Susanne Vandegrift Moore–Bucks County
 James Morrow—Philadelphia
 Lance Morrow—Philadelphia
 John O'Hara—Pottsville
 Ralph Peters—Pottsville / Schuylkill Haven
 Robert W. Peterson—Warren
 Darryl Ponicsan—Shenandoah
 Ezra Pound—Wyncote
 Conrad Richter—Pine Grove
 Mary Rinehart—Pittsburgh
 Julia H. Scott–Sheshequin
 Lisa Scottoline—Philadelphia
 Sara Shepard—Downingtown
 Dora Adele Shoemaker—Philadelphia
 Luella Dowd Smith–Sheffield
 Martin Cruz Smith—Reading
 Stephen Sondheim—Doylestown
 Jerry Spinelli—Norristown
 Jerry Stahl—Pittsburgh
 Gertrude Stein—Allegheny
 Gerald Stern—Pittsburgh
 Wallace Stevens—Reading
 Ida Tarbell—Titusville
 Bayard Taylor—Chester County
 Eva Griffith Thompson–Jennersville
 John Updike—Reading
 Ellen Oliver Van Fleet—Troy
 Judith Vollmer—Pittsburgh
 Sarah Stokes Walton—Philadelphia
 Jeannette H. Walworth–—Philadelphia
 Joseph Wambaugh–—East Pittsburgh
 Catharine H. Waterman—Philadelphia
 Lauren Weisberger—Allentown
 John Edgar Wideman—Pittsburgh
 Marianne Wiggins—Lancaster
 August Wilson—Pittsburgh
 Owen Wister—Philadelphia
 Jeffrey Zaslow—Broomall
 Calvin Ziegler—Rebersburg

Computer scientists and mathematicians

 Scott Aaronson—Philadelphia
 John Backus—Philadelphia
 David A. Bader—Bethlehem
 Brendan Eich—Pittsburgh
 Martin Charles Golumbic—Erie
 Emil Grosswald—Narberth
 William Draper Harkins—Titusville
 Chad Hurley—Birdsboro
 Oliver Dimon Kellogg—Linwood
 Alan Kotok—Philadelphia
 Michael L. Littman—Philadelphia
 Alan Perlis—Pittsburgh
 Hilary Putnam—Philadelphia
 Jeffrey Shallit—Philadelphia
 George Stibitz—York
 E. Roy Weintraub—Philadelphia

Conservationists

 Charles Babcock—Oil City
 Rachel Carson—Springdale
 Paul R. Ehrlich—Germantown
 Inky Moore—Newville
 Joseph Rothrock—McVeytown
 Howard Zahniser—Franklin

Criminals

 Mumia Abu-Jamal—Philadelphia
 George Banks—Wilkes-Barre
 Richard Baumhammers—Pittsburgh
 Angelo Bruno—Philadelphia
 Andrew Thomas DelGiorno—Philadelphia
 Mickey Duffy—Philadelphia
 Ira Einhorn—Philadelphia
 Caleb Fairley—Gulph Mills
 George Feigley—Harrisburg
 Eric Frein—Canadensis
 Kermit Gosnell—Philadelphia
 Gary M. Heidnik—Philadelphia
 Maxie "Boo Boo" Hoff—Philadelphia
 Eddie James—Bristol
 Joseph Kallinger—Philadelphia
 Timothy Krajcir—West Mahanoy
 Alec Devon Kreider—Lancaster County
 Ignatius Lanzetta—Philadelphia
 Leo Lanzetta—Philadelphia
 John LaRocca—Indiana County
 Joey Merlino—Philadelphia
 Charles Carl Roberts—Lancaster
 Jerry Sandusky—Washington
 Frank "The Irishman" Sheeran—Darby
 Sundance Kid—Mont Clare
 Philip Testa—Philadelphia
 Salvatore Testa—Philadelphia

Educators

 Robert Balling, professor of geography, Arizona State University—Uniontown
 Algernon Sydney Biddle (1847–1891), lawyer and law professor at the University of Pennsylvania Law School
 Francis Bohlen (1868–1942), Algernon Sydney Biddle professor of law at the University of Pennsylvania Law School
 Derek Bok, 25th President of Harvard University—Bryn Mawr
 Adda Burch (1869-1929), teacher-missionary at Concepción College, Concepción, Chile
 Daniel Chamovitz, biologist, author of What a Plant Knows, and President of Ben Gurion University of the Negev
 Harold W. Dodds, 15th President of Princeton University—Utica
 Steven Drizin, lawyer and law professor at the Northwestern University Pritzker School of Law
 Thomas Messinger Drown, fourth President of Lehigh University—Philadelphia
 C. Clement French, sixth president of Washington State University—Philadelphia
 Thomas F. George, chancellor and professor of chemistry and physics, University of Missouri–St. Louis—Philadelphia
 Leonard Hayflick, Professor of Anatomy, University of California, San Francisco—Philadelphia
 Susan Henking—Paoli, president of Shimer College
 John W. Heston, second president of Washington State; third president of South Dakota State; fourth president of Dakota State—Bellefonte
 John Heuser, Professor of Biophysics, Washington University School of Medicine—Pittsburgh
 John Honnold (1915-2011), law professor at the University of Pennsylvania Law School
 Andrew Knoll, Fisher Professor of Natural History and Professor of Earth and Planetary Sciences, Harvard University—West Reading
 Noyes Leech (1921–2010), law professor at the University of Pennsylvania Law School
 Philip Morrison, Institute Professor Emeritus and professor of physics emeritus, Massachusetts Institute of Technology—Pittsburgh
 Julia Anna Orum (1843-1904), principal, Philadelphia School of Elocution
 Christopher Stuart Patterson (1842–1924), Dean of the University of Pennsylvania Law School
 Wendell Pritchett, Chancellor of Rutgers University–Camden, Interim Dean and Presidential Professor at the University of Pennsylvania Law School, and Provost of the University of Pennsylvania
 Curtis R. Reitz (born 1929), Algernon Sydney Biddle Professor of Law at the University of Pennsylvania Law School—Reading
 Louis B. Schwartz (1913-2003), law professor at the University of Pennsylvania Law School—Philadelphia
 David Soll, biology professor, University of Iowa—Philadelphia
 Clyde Summers (1918-2010), labor lawyer and law professor at the University of Pennsylvania Law School—Germantown
 Bernard Wolfman (1924–2011), Dean of the University of Pennsylvania Law School and law professor—Philadelphia
 John Yoo, Professor of Law at the University of California, Berkeley—Philadelphia

Engineers and inventors

 James Henry Carpenter—Reading, Berks County
 Edgar Cortright—Hastings
 Sidney Darlington—Pittsburgh
 William C. Davis Jr.—Shinglehouse
 Henry Deringer—Johnstown
 Nance Dicciani—Philadelphia
 J. Presper Eckert—Philadelphia
 Jesse Fell—Wilkes-Barre
 Matthias Forney—Hanover
 Benjamin Franklin—Boston, Massachusetts
 Daniel French—Brownsville and Philadelphia
 Robert Fulton—Little Britain
 Frank Hastings Griffin—Chester
 Mary Hallock-Greenewalt—Philadelphia
 George H. Heilmeier—Philadelphia
 John Kanzius—Washington
 Samuel Kier—Conemaugh Township
 Thomas Midgley Jr.—Beaver Falls
 William C. Pfefferle—Philadelphia
 Alan Pritsker—Philadelphia
 Henry Miller Shreve—Brownsville
 Jacob Snider—Philadelphia
 Frederick Winslow Taylor—Philadelphia
 William Hultz Walker—Pittsburgh
 Nathaniel Wyeth—Chadds Ford

Entrepreneurs, industrialists, and business executives

 John Aglialoro—Philadelphia
 Peter Angelos—Pittsburgh
 James Ford Bell—Philadelphia
 Manoj Bhargava—Philadelphia
 Steve Bisciotti—Philadelphia
 Mary Boone—Erie
 Amar Bose—Philadelphia
 Norman Braman—West Chester / Philadelphia
 Washington Atlee Burpee—Philadelphia
 Andrew Carnegie—Allegheny
 Joan Carter—Pittsburgh
 Kayla Collins—Reading
 Henry Pomeroy Davison—Troy
 Mark Donovan—–Pittsburgh
 David Edgerton—–Lebanon
 Ella M. George—–Beaver Falls
 Alex Grass—–Scranton
 Clement Griscom—–Philadelphia
 Mahlon Haines—–York
 Joe Hardy—–Pittsburgh
 Maggie Hardy Knox—–Pittsburgh
 Richard Hayne—–Philadelphia
 Milton S. Hershey—–Derry Church (Hershey)
 George Washington Hill—–Philadelphia
 Anna Morris Holstein—–Muncy
 Alfred Hunt—–Bethlehem, Brownsville and Philadelphia
 Lee Iacocca—Allentown
 Bennett S. LeBow—Philadelphia
 Larry Lucchino—Pittsburgh
 David Montgomery—Philadelphia
 Robert Nardelli—Old Forge
 Amedeo Obici—Wilkes-Barre
 Asa Packer—Jim Thorpe (originally called Mauch Chunk)
 H.B. Reese—Derry Church (Hershey)
 Frank Resnik—Unity Township
 Brian Roberts—Philadelphia
 Art Rooney—Coulterville
 Art Rooney II—Pittsburgh
 Richard Mellon Scaife—Pittsburgh
 Charles M. Schwab—Williamsburg / Loretto
 James Sinegal—Pittsburgh
 Jeffrey Skilling—Pittsburgh
 Jim Stamatis—Lehigh Valley
 John Surma—Pittsburgh
 David Tepper—Pittsburgh
 Thomas Usher—Reading
 Jerry Wolman—Shenandoah
 Joseph Wharton—Philadelphia
 Isaiah Vansant Williamson—Bensalem Township
 Samuel Van Leer—Reading

Film directors, producers, and screenwriters

 M. K. Asante—Philadelphia
 Joe Augustyn—Philadelphia
 Donald P. Bellisario—Cokeburg
 Shane Black—Pittsburgh
 Richard Brooks—Philadelphia
 Chris Columbus—Spangler
 Rusty Cundieff—Pittsburgh
 Lee Daniels—Philadelphia
 Brian De Palma—Philadelphia
 Caleb Deschanel—Philadelphia
 Neal Dodson—York
 David M. Evans—Wilkes-Barre
 Peter Farrelly—Phoenixville
 Jonathan Frakes—Bellefonte
 Antoine Fuqua—Pittsburgh
 Todd Gallagher—Greensburg
 Rowdy Herrington—Pittsburgh
 Marshall Herskovitz—Philadelphia
 Tigre Hill—Philadelphia
 Tamar Simon Hoffs—Johnstown
 Todd Holland—Meadville
 David Hollander—Pittsburgh
 Kevin Hooks—Philadelphia
 David Howard—Philadelphia
 Tamara Jenkins—Philadelphia
 Clark Johnson—Philadelphia
 Deborah Kaplan—Abington
 Irvin Kershner—Philadelphia
 Randal Kleiser—Philadelphia
 Harold F. Kress—Pittsburgh
 Charles Leavitt—Pittsburgh
 Richard Lester—Philadelphia
 Herschell Gordon Lewis—Pittsburgh
 Steven Lisberger—Philadelphia
 Sidney Lumet—Philadelphia
 Abby Mann—Philadelphia / East Pittsburgh
 Kathleen Marshall—Pittsburgh
 Elaine May—Philadelphia
 Melanie Mayron—Philadelphia
 Adam McKay—Malvern
 Nancy Meyers—Philadelphia
 Jason Miller—Scranton
 David Mirkin—Philadelphia
 Clifford Odets—Philadelphia
 Eric Red—Pittsburgh
James Rolfe—Philadelphia
 Richard Rossi—Pittsburgh
 Alvin Sargent—Philadelphia
 Tom Savini—Pittsburgh
 Edwin Sherin—Harrisburg
 M. Night Shyamalan—Philadelphia
 Jerry Stahl—Pittsburgh
 Joseph Strick—Braddock
 Andrew Kevin Walker—Altoona / Mechanicsburg
 Paul Wendkos—Philadelphia
 Sam Wood—Philadelphia
 Bud Yorkin—Washington

Musicians

 A–G

 Christina Aguilera—Pittsburgh
 Josh Balz ex keyboardist, Motionless in White
 Marian Anderson—Philadelphia
 Mark Andes—Philadelphia
 Frankie Avalon—Philadelphia
 Samuel Barber—West Chester
 Gabby Barrett--Pittsburgh
 Franny Beecher—Norristown
 George Benson—Pittsburgh
 Les Brown—Lykens
 Jordana Bryant—outside Philadelphia
 Benjamin Burnley—Wilkes Barre
 Bilal—Philadelphia
 Joe Bonsall—Philadelphia
 Glenn Branca—Harrisburg
 Solomon Burke—Philadelphia
 Vanessa Carlton—Milford
 Sabrina Carpenter—Quakertown
 Cassidy—Philadelphia
 Danny Cedrone—Philadelphia
 Chubby Checker—Philadelphia
 Lou Christie—Moon Township
 Todd Tamanend Clark—Greensboro
 Stanley Clarke—Philadelphia
 Vinnie Colaiuta—Brownsville
 John Coltrane—Philadelphia
 Perry Como—Canonsburg
 Joey Covington—Johnstown
 Crobot (rock band)—Pottsville
 Jim Croce—South Philadelphia
 Patrick Dahlheimer—York
 Bobby Dall—Mechanicsburg
 Lacy J. Dalton—Bloomsburg
 Daya—Pittsburgh
 Jimmy Dorsey—Shenandoah
 Tommy Dorsey—Shenandoah
 Jimmy DeGrasso—Bethlehem
 Esteban—Pittsburgh
 Kevin Eubanks—Philadelphia
 Jackie Evancho—Pittsburgh
 Eve—Philadelphia
 Renée Fleming—Indiana
 Stephen Foster—Pittsburgh
 James Moyer Franks—Trappe
 Freeway—Philadelphia
 James Allen Gähres—Harrisburg
 Joe Genaro, The Dead Milkmen—Wagontown
 Stan Getz—Philadelphia
 Adam "DJ AM" Goldstein—Philadelphia
 Chad Gracey—York
 Johnny Grande—Philadelphia
 Anthony Green—Doylestown
 Justin Guarini—Doylestown

 H–M

 Hair Rocket—Philadelphia indie rock band
 Lzzy Hale—Red Lion
 Daryl Hall—Pottstown
 Mary Hallock-Greenewalt—Philadelphia
 Dan Hartman—Harrisburg
 Phyllis Hyman—Pittsburgh
 Donnie Iris—Ellwood City
 Keith Jarrett—Allentown
 DJ Jazzy Jeff—Philadelphia
 Joan Jett—Philadelphia
 Allan Jones—Old Forge
 Wiz Khalifa—Pittsburgh
 Jason Karaban—Norristown
 Tom Keifer—Springfield
 Chris Kirkpatrick ('N Sync)—Clarion
 Richie Kotzen—Reading
 Ed Kowalczyk—York
 Kurupt—Philadelphia
 Jeff LaBar—Darby
 Patti LaBelle—Philadelphia
 Mario Lanza—Philadelphia
 Rodney Linderman, The Dead Milkmen—Wagontown
 Lil Peep (Gustav Elijah Åhr)—Allentown
 Lil Skies—Waynesboro
 Lil Uzi Vert—Philadelphia
 Lisa Lopes—Philadelphia
 Kellee Maize—Pittsburgh
 Henry Mancini—Aliquippa
 Fred Mascherino—Philadelphia, Coatesville
 Al Martino—Philadelphia
 Pat Martino—Philadelphia
 Billy May—Pittsburgh
 Dan McKeown—Philadelphia
 Meek Mill—Philadelphia
 Mac Miller—Pittsburgh
 Garnet Mimms—Philadelphia
 Bret Michaels—Butler
 Mirah—Philadelphia
 Irene Molloy—Doylestown
 Patrick Monahan—Erie
 Chris Motionless—Scranton
 Musiq Soulchild—Philadelphia

 N–Z

 Jaco Pastorius—Norristown
 Billy Paul—Philadelphia
 Teddy Pendergrass—Philadelphia
 Christina Perri—Bensalem
 Pink—Doylestown
 Jack Pleis—Philadelphia
 Questlove—Philadelphia
 Sun Ra—Philadelphia
 Trent Reznor—Mercer
 PnB Rock—Philadelphia
 Rikki Rockett—Mechanicsburg
 Asher Roth—Morrisville
 Todd Rundgren—Upper Darby
 Bobby Rydell—Philadelphia
 Ira D. Sankey—New Castle
 Santogold—Philadelphia
 Schooly D—Philadelphia
 Jill Scott—Philadelphia
 Shanice—Pittsburgh
 Beanie Sigel—Philadelphia
 Langhorne Slim (Sean Scolnick (Langhorne Slim)—Langhorne
 Will Smith—Philadelphia
 Ivy Sole—Philadelphia
 Jack Stauber—Erie
 Leopold Stokowski—Philadelphia
 Taylor Swift—Reading
 Tammi Terrell—Philadelphia
 McCoy Tyner—Philadelphia
 Bobby Vinton—Canonsburg
 Chris Vrenna—Erie
 John Walker—Johnstown
 Dean Ween—New Hope
 Gene Ween—Philadelphia
 M. E. Willson—Penfield
 Denison Witmer, Lancaster
 Michael J. Woodard—Philadelphia
 Syreeta Wright—Pittsburgh

Natural scientists and physicians

 Edward Acheson—Washington
 Anurag Agrawal—Allentown
 Christian Anfinsen—Monessen
 Alexander Dallas Bache—Philadelphia
 Albert Barnes—Philadelphia
 Michael Behe—Altoona
 Elmer Bolton—Frankford
 James Bond—Philadelphia
 James Booth—Philadelphia
 Herbert Boyer—Derry
 Robert Breed—Brooklyn Township
 Michael Stuart Brown—Wyncote
 Sean M. Carroll—Philadelphia
 Rachel Carson—Springdale
 Daniel Chamovitz—Aliquippa
 Britton Chance—Wilkes-Barre
 Ralph Cicerone—New Castle
 Edward Cope—Philadelphia
 James F. Crow—Phoenixville
 George Delahunty—Upper Darby 
 John Dorrance—Bristol
 Alice Evans—Neath
 John Frazer—Philadelphia
 Frederick Genth—Philadelphia
 Frederick Grinnell—Philadelphia
 Robert Hare—Philadelphia
 William Harkins—Titusville
 Philip Hench—Pittsburgh
 Berwind Kaufmann—Philadelphia
 Charles Keeling—Scranton
 John Kopchick—Punxsutawney
 Stephanie Kwolek—New Kensington
 Edward Lewis—Wilkes-Barre
 Stephen Lippard—Pittsburgh
 William Madia—Wilkinsburg
 Daniel Mazia—Scranton
 Samuel George Morton—Philadelphia
 Jack Myers—Damascus Township
 Charles Overberger—Barnesboro
 Mary Pennington—Philadelphia
 Anna M. Longshore Potts–Attleboro (now Langhorne)
 George Prendergast—Philadelphia
 John Quackenbush—Kingston
David L. Reich—Philadelphia
 Theodore Richards—Germantown
 Charles Rick—Reading
 Anita Roberts—Pittsburgh
 James Rogers—Philadelphia
 William Rogers—Philadelphia
 Henry Augustus Rowland—Honesdale
 Beth Shapiro—Allentown
 Alex Shigo—Duquesne
 Lester Shubin—Philadelphia
 Neil Shubin—Philadelphia
 Daniel Simberloff—Wilson
 Edgar Smith—York
 Howard Temin—Philadelphia
 Claude Alvin Villee Jr.—Lancaster
 Bernardhus Van Leer (1687–1790), one of the first doctors in New York
 William Walker—Pittsburgh
 Michael Welner—Pittsburgh
 Caspar Wistar—Philadelphia
 Rake Yohn—West Chester
 Roger Young—Burgettstown

Politics, government, and military

 A–M

 Claude Allen, assistant to the President for domestic policy under George W. Bush—Philadelphia
 Jason Altmire, author and U.S. Representative—Lower Burrell
 Henry "Hap" Arnold, U.S. Army and U.S. Air Force General—Gladwyne
 John C. Bell Jr., 33rd Governor of Pennsylvania—Philadelphia
 Joe Biden, current President of the United States, 47th Vice President of the United States (2009–2017), longtime U.S. Senator from Delaware (1973–2009)—Scranton
 Robert Bork, Solicitor General, Attorney General, Judge of the D.C. Circuit Court of Appeals, Supreme Court nominee—Pittsburgh
 John Boyd, USAF fighter pilot and Pentagon consultant, developer of the OODA loop—Erie
 Martin Grove Brumbaugh, 26th Governor of Pennsylvania—Huntingdon County
 James Buchanan, 15th President of the United States—Cove Gap
 Smedley Butler, U.S. Marine Corps General—West Chester
 Frank Carlucci, U.S. Secretary of Defense under Ronald Reagan—Scranton
 Samuel Carpenter, first Treasurer 1704, Deputy Governor to William Penn—Philadelphia
 Ashton Carter, U.S. Secretary of Defense under Barack Obama—Philadelphia
 Bob Casey Jr., US Senator, son of former Governor—Scranton
 Robert P. Casey, 42nd Governor of Pennsylvania—Scranton
 Benjamin Chew, Chief Justice of Supreme Court of Pennsylvania, state Attorney General—Philadelphia
 Joseph Clancy, Director of Secret Service under Barack Obama—Philadelphia
 Mark B. Cohen, Democratic chairman, Human Services Committee, Pennsylvania House of Representatives
 William Coleman, U.S. Secretary of Transportation under Gerald Ford—Philadelphia
 Tom Corbett, 46th Governor of Pennsylvania—Philadelphia
 George M. Dallas, 11th Vice President of the United States—Philadelphia
 James J. Davis, U.S. Secretary of Labor, U.S. Senator—Pittsburgh
 James H. Duff, U.S. Senator and 34th Governor—Carnegie
 R. Budd Dwyer, treasurer, State Senator and Representative—Harrisburg
 George Howard Earle III, 30th Governor of Pennsylvania—Montgomery County
 Peter Feaver, National Security Council member for Clinton and Bush administrations—Bethlehem
 Bob Filner, Mayor of San Diego—Pittsburgh
 John Stuchell Fisher, 29th Governor of Pennsylvania—South Mahoning Twp.
 Benjamin Franklin, scientist, diplomat, teacher, and founding father of the United States—Philadelphia
 Frank Gaffney, Deputy Assistant Secretary of Defense under Ronald Reagan—Pittsburgh
 Newt Gingrich, Speaker of the U.S. House of Representatives—Harrisburg
 Alexander Haig, Secretary of State, White House Chief of Staff, NATO Supreme Commander—Philadelphia
 Winfield Scott Hancock, Union Civil War commander—Montgomeryville
 Orrin Hatch, Republican senator from Utah—Pittsburgh
 Michael Hayden, Director of CIA under George W. Bush—Pittsburgh
 William G. Hundley, criminal defense attorney—Pittsburgh
 Harold L. Ickes, Secretary of Interior under Franklin D. Roosevelt—Altoona
 Arthur James, 31st Governor of Pennsylvania—Plymouth
 Michael Johns, U.S. Presidential speechwriter—Emmaus
 George Joulwan, U.S. Army General—Pottsville
 John Kasich, Congressman from Ohio (1983–2001), 69th Governor of Ohio, presidential candidate in 2016 and 2000—Pittsburgh
 Donald Kohn, Vice Chairman of Federal Reserve—Philadelphia
 Alf Landon, Governor of Kansas and presidential candidate—West Middlesex
 Andrew Lewis, Secretary of Transportation under Ronald Reagan—Philadelphia
 Richard Marcinko, Navy Seal, commanded Seal Team Six—Lansford
 George Marshall, Secretary of Defense under Harry S. Truman—Uniontown
 Edward Martin, U.S. Senator and 32nd Governor of Pennsylvania—Ten Mile
 Betsy McCaughey, Lieutenant Governor of state of New York—Pittsburgh
 John J. McCloy, Assistant Secretary of War during World War II—Philadelphia
 H. R. McMaster, National Security Advisor, U.S. Army Lt. General—Philadelphia
 Royal Meeker, advisor to President Woodrow Wilson—Quaker Lake
 Thomas Mifflin, first Governor of Pennsylvania—Philadelphia

 N–Z

 Janet Napolitano, U.S. Secretary of Homeland Security—Pittsburgh
 Benjamin Netanyahu, Prime Minister of Israel—Cheltenham Township
 Clarence Charles Newcomer (1923–2005), US District Judge of the United States District Court for the Eastern District of Pennsylvania 
 John Olver, U.S. Representative from Massachusetts—Honesdale
 Alexander Mitchell Palmer, U.S. Attorney General, director of controversial Palmer Raids—White Haven
 Rand Paul, U.S. Senator (R-KY)—Pittsburgh
 Ron Paul, U.S. House of Representatives (R-TX)—Pittsburgh
 Samuel W. Pennypacker, 23rd Governor of Pennsylvania—Phoenixville
 Robert Reich, Secretary of Labor under Bill Clinton—Scranton
 Ed Rendell, 45th Governor of Pennsylvania—Philadelphia
 George S. Rentz, World War II Navy Chaplain and Navy Cross awardee—Lebanon
 Tom Ridge, Governor, first Secretary of Homeland Security—Munhall
 Alice Rivlin, Director of the Office of Management and Budget under Bill Clinton, Vice Chair of the Federal Reserve System—Philadelphia
 John Roll, federal judge slain in 2011 Tucson shooting in Arizona—Pittsburgh
 Dan Rooney, U.S. Ambassador to Ireland—Pittsburgh
 Betsy Ross, credited maker of original American flag—Philadelphia
 Bayard Rustin, activist, organizer of social movements for civil rights, socialism, nonviolence, and gay rights—West Chester
 Richard Schweiker, Congressman, Senator, and Secretary of Health and Human Services under Ronald Reagan—Norristown
 Joe Sestak, Navy Admiral and Congressman—Secane
 Raymond P. Shafer, Governor of Pennsylvania—New Castle
 Jeanne Shaheen, U.S. Senator and Governor of New Hampshire—Selinsgrove
 Don Sherwood, U.S. Representative (R-PA)—Tunkhannock
 D. Brooks Smith, federal judge on Court of Appeals—Altoona
 Carl Andrew Spaatz, WWII general and first Chief of Staff of the U.S. Air Force—Boyertown
 Arlen Specter, U.S. Senator (R-PA)—Philadelphia
 William Cameron Sproul, 27th Governor of Pennsylvania—Lancaster County
 Thaddeus Stevens, Constitutional activist—Gettysburg
 William A. Stone, 22nd Governor of Pennsylvania—Wellsboro
 Edwin Sydney Stuart, 24th Governor of Pennsylvania—Philadelphia
 Lawrence Summers, Director of National Economic Council under Barack Obama—Penn Valley
Gregory Tony  (born 1978), Sheriff of Broward County, Florida-Philadelphia
 Charlemagne Tower, lawyer, mining magnate and landowner—Pottsville
 Samuel Van Leer, Pennsylvania Irons works owner and a United States Army officer—Chester County
 Tom Vilsack, U.S. Secretary of Agriculture, Governor of Iowa—Pittsburgh
 Alfred L. Wilson, U.S. Army Medal of Honor recipient—Fairchance
 Curtin Winsor Jr., U.S. Ambassador to Costa Rica under Ronald Reagan—Philadelphia
 Richard Winters, 101st Airborne, 506th E Company, World War II—Lancaster

Radio and television

 Jodi Applegate, broadcast journalist—Moon Township
 Michael Barkann, radio talk show host, television host—Newtown Square
 Chuck Barris, television host and producer—Philadelphia
 John Batchelor, radio talk show host—Bryn Mawr / Lower Merion Township
 Jaiden Nichols, youtuber—Pittsburgh 
 Ron Bennington, radio personality and comedian, The Ron and Fez Show—Philadelphia
 Jerry Blavat, disc jockey—Philadelphia
 Neal Boortz, libertarian radio talk show host—Bryn Mawr
 Michael Buffer, ring announcer known for his trademarked catchphrase, "Let's get ready to rumble!"—Philadelphia / Roslyn
 Steve Burns, original host of the kids' show Blue's Clues—Boyertown
 Steve Capus, former president of NBC News—Bryn Mawr
 Todd Christensen, sports broadcaster for the MountainWest Sports Network—Bellefonte
 Myron Cope, former Pittsburgh Steelers radio personality—Pittsburgh
 Regis Cordic, former radio personality; actor in Columbo, Gunsmoke—Pittsburgh
 Jim Cramer, television personality—Wyndmoor
 Bill Cullen, television personality—Pittsburgh
 Sharon Epperson, correspondent for CNBC—Pittsburgh
 Howard Eskin, Philadelphia-based sports radio personality—Philadelphia
 Debra Fox, television anchor—Pittsburgh
 Pauline Frederick, newspaper, TV, and radio journalist—Gallitzin
 Alan Freed, radio disc jockey who coined the term "Rock and Roll"—Windber
 Courtney Friel, entertainment reporter for Fox News—Norristown
 Louis Glackens, illustrator—Philadelphia
 Jon & Kate Gosselin, reality TV personalities (Jon & Kate Plus 8), family of 10 with sextuplets and twins—Wyomissing
 Andy Gresh, talk show host, television host, color commentator—Brownsville
 Marc Lamont Hill, BET News correspondent, CNN political commentator—Philadelphia
 Marilyn Horne, opera singer—Bradford
 Abby Huntsman, co-host of Fox & Friends Weekend—Philadelphia
 Suzy Kolber, television sportscaster—Upper Dublin Township
 Andrea Kremer, television sportscaster—Philadelphia
 Carson Kressley, TV personality, Queer Eye, How to Look Good Naked—Allentown
 Mark Levin, radio talk show host, conservative political commentator—Cheltenham Township
 Joe Lunardi, college basketball analyst for ESPN—Philadelphia
 Meredith Marakovits, New York Yankees clubhouse reporter for the YES Network—Walnutport
 Bam Margera, reality television personality and skateboarder—West Chester
 Chris Matthews, political commentator, MSNBC's Hardball—Philadelphia
 Billy Mays, TV direct-response advertising salesman and star of Discovery Channel's Pitchmen—McKees Rocks
 Michael Medved, talk radio host, conservative commentator, film critic—Philadelphia
 Jeanne Moos, broadcast journalist for CNN—Pittsburgh
 Clayton Morris, co-host of Fox & Friends Weekend—Spring Township
 Charlie O'Donnell, radio/TV announcer, primarily on game shows—Philadelphia
 Beth Ostrosky, model, judge on ABC's True Beauty and host of G4's Filter—Pittsburgh
 Victoria Pedretti, actress in The Haunting series and You — Fairless Hills
 Billy Porter, actor in Pose and Broadway performer in Kinky Boots—Pittsburgh
 Jack Posobiec, correspondent for One America News Network—Norristown
 Fred Rogers, television personality, Mr. Rogers' Neighborhood—Latrobe
 Norman Rose, radio announcer (NBC's Dimension X and CBS Radio Mystery Theater)—Philadelphia
 Ryan Sampson, radio personality, The Morning Mash Up Sirius XM Hits 1—Titusville
 Ray Scott, sportscaster for the Green Bay Packers—Johnstown
 Steve Scully, host of C-SPAN's Washington Journal—Erie
 Paul Shannon, host of Adventuretime, WTAE Channel 4—Crafton
 Dick Stockton, sportscaster for Fox Sports and Turner Sports—Philadelphia
 Andrea Tantaros, political analyst and commentator on Fox News and Fox Business Network—Allentown
 Jake Tapper, anchor for CNN, The Lead with Jake Tapper, State of the Union—Philadelphia
 Jesse Watters, commentator for Fox News, host of Watters' World—Philadelphia
 Kristen Welker, broadcast journalist for NBC News—Philadelphia
 Maddie Ziegler, actor, featured dancer on Dance Moms—Murrysville

Religion

 Tony Campolo—Philadelphia
 Fanny DuBois Chase—Great Bend
 Walter Ciszek—Shenandoah
 Harvey Cox—Malvern
 Mary Helen Peck Crane–Wilkes-Barre
 Amy Eilberg—Philadelphia
 Prince Demetrius Gallitzin—Cambria County
 Washington Gladden—Pottsgrove
 Lillian Resler Harford–Mount Pleasant
 Barry Lynn—Harrisburg / Bethlehem
 Jeanette DuBois Meech–Frankford
 Bruce Metzger—Middletown
 Mary A. Miller–Allegheny
 David Miscavige—Bucks County
 Joseph Murgas—Wilkes Barre / Slovakia
 Michael Novak—Johnstown
 Charles Taze Russell—Pittsburgh
 Rev. Jeremiah Wright—Philadelphia

Social scientists and academics

 Russell L. Ackoff—Philadelphia
 Clayton Alderfer—Sellersville
 Gary Becker—Pottsville
 Julian Bond—Philadelphia
 Edwin Boring—Philadelphia
 Leonard Burman—Philadelphia
 Paul Cameron—Pittsburgh
 Henry Charles Carey—Philadelphia
 Leonard Carmichael—Philadelphia
 James McKeen Cattell—Easton
 Noam Chomsky—Philadelphia
 Randolph Cohen—Philadelphia
 Leda Cosmides—Philadelphia
 Robert Costanza—Pittsburgh
 Albert Ellis—Pittsburgh
 Joshua Fishman—Philadelphia
 W. Nelson Francis—Philadelphia
 Harry Frankfurt—Langhorne
 Walter Freeman—Philadelphia
 Howard Gardner—Scranton
 Henry George—Philadelphia
 Douglas Holtz-Eakin—Pittsburgh
 Noel Ignatiev—Philadelphia
 Jane Jacobs—Scranton
 Jacob Kantor—Harrisburg
 William Keen—Philadelphia
 Sally Kohn—Allentown
 Donald N. Levine—New Castle
 Edward B. Lewis—Wilkes-Barre
 Esther J. Trimble Lippincott–Kimberton
 John McWhorter—Philadelphia
 Margaret Mead—Philadelphia / Doylestown
 Robert K. Merton—Philadelphia
 Albert Jay Nock—Scranton
 Hilary Putnam—Philadelphia
 Robert Reich—Scranton
 David Riesman—Philadelphia
 Clinton Rossiter—Philadelphia
 Michael Rubin—Philadelphia
 B. F. Skinner—Susquehanna
 Jude Wanniski—Pottsville
 Walter Williams—Philadelphia
 Alan Wolfe—Philadelphia
 Michael Yates—Pittsburgh
 Robert Yerkes—Breadysville, Bucks County

See also

 List of people from Erie, Pennsylvania
List of people from the Lehigh Valley
 List of people from Lancaster County, Pennsylvania
 List of people from Philadelphia
 List of people from the Pittsburgh metropolitan area
 List of people from York, Pennsylvania

Notes

References

External links
"Famous People from the Lehigh Valley," The Morning Call, August 18, 2006